Pronin (Russian: Про́нин), or Pronina (feminine; Про́нина), is a Russian surname, it may refer to:

Ivan Pronin
Mikhail Pronin
Vladimir Pronin (disambiguation)
Vasily Pronin
Nikolai Pronin
Natali Pronina

Other uses
Captain Pronin, a Russian animated film series